Petr Samec (born 14 February 1964) is a Czech former footballer who played as a striker for several Czech clubs. He was a prolific goalscorer and with nine goals was the best goalscorer of the 1995–96 UEFA Cup Winners' Cup.

References
 
 

1964 births
Living people
People from Frýdek-Místek
Czech footballers
Czechoslovak footballers
Association football forwards
Czech Republic international footballers
Czech First League players
MFK Vítkovice players
SK Sigma Olomouc players
SK Dynamo České Budějovice players
FK Drnovice players
FK Hvězda Cheb players
FC Baník Ostrava players
FC Hradec Králové players
FC Hlučín players
Czech football managers
Sportspeople from the Moravian-Silesian Region